Vere Lucy Temple (8 February 1898 – 14 March 1980) was a British artist, best known for her illustrations of British wildlife. She had a particular interest in entomology.

Life
Vere Temple was born at Boreham Manor, two miles east of Warminster, Wiltshire to parents Grenville and Katherine Temple. Grenville Taylor was a man of "private means". She showed an early aptitude for art, and her mother compiled an album of her drawings, the earliest of which was dated December 1901 and in which "it is possible to spot evidence of the extraordinary 'eye' which was in due course to blossom".  From the 1920s her work was exhibited in many leading galleries across the country. In 1932 Temple had her portrait painted by Sir Cedric Morris.

In 1939 she was living in a flat in Notting Hill, London. By the 1940s, Temple was living at Tollard Royal, Wiltshire. She died in 1980 in Ringwood, Hampshire. In 1981, an auction of her "studio collection of very fine botanical, entomological, domestic and wildlife drawings, watercolours and book illustrations" was sold in more than 180 lots by the auctioneers Lawrence's of Crewkerne.

By 1947, Temple was a Member of the Royal Entomological Society of London.

Examples of her art are held in the collections of the British Council, Manchester City Gallery, the National Portrait Gallery and the Museum of New Zealand Te Papa Tongarewa.

Books by Vere Temple
An Artist Goes to the Dogs (1937)
Baby Animals on the Farm, and How to Draw Them  (1941)
How to Draw Wild Flowers (1942) London: Studio Publications
Butterflies and Moths in Britain (1945)  London: B. T. Batsford
Flowers and Butterflies (1946) London; New York: The Studio, "How To Do It" Series, no. 33
British Butterflies (1949) London: Collins, "Britain in Pictures" Series
How to Draw Pond Life (1956) London: Studio Publications

Illustrating others' works
Hedgerow Tales by Enid Blyton (1935)
Hutchinson's Dog Encyclopaedia (1935)
Insect Life in Britain by Geoffrey Taylor (1945)
British Garden Flowers by George M. Taylor (1946)
Some British Beetles by Geoffrey Taylor (1948)

Catalogues 

 List of water colours of British plants and trees executed by Vere Temple of Kings Chase, Tollard Royal, Salisbury

References

External links
Vere Temple on Artnet
Vere Temple at the Database of Scientific Illustrators 1450–1950, University of Stuttgart
Works at Manchester Art Gallery, archived in 2012

1898 births
1980 deaths
20th-century English women artists
20th-century British zoologists
British draughtsmen
English illustrators
Fellows of the Royal Entomological Society
Women entomologists